Buchadó is a village in the municipality of Vigía del Fuerte in the Colombian department of Antioquia. The village is situated on the east bank of the Atrato river, which marks the border with the Chocó department on the west bank.

Climate
Buchadó has a very wet tropical rainforest climate (Af).

References

Populated places in the Antioquia Department